Mount Palmer is a  mountain in the Chugach Mountains in the U.S. state of Alaska. It is located within the Municipality of Anchorage.

It is named in honor of George W. Palmer, a trader who operated a store near this area in the early 1900s.

References

Mountains of Anchorage, Alaska
Mountains of Alaska